The 2021–22 2. Bundesliga was the 48th season of the 2. Bundesliga. It began on 23 July 2021 and concluded on 15 May 2022.

The fixtures were announced on 25 June 2021.

Teams

Team changes

Stadiums and locations

Personnel and kits

Managerial changes

League table

Results

Relegation play-offs
The relegation play-offs took place on 20 and 24 May 2022.

Overview

|}

Matches
All times Central European Summer Time (UTC+2)

1. FC Kaiserslautern won 2–0 on aggregate

Top scorers

Number of teams by state

Notes

References

External links

2021–22 in German football leagues
2021–22
Germany